The Eritrean Cup is the top knockout football tournament in Eritrea.

Winners
Note: Only known winners are listed.
2009: Denden (beat Tesfa 2–1 in final)
2011: Maitemanai
2013: Maitemanai

References

Football competitions in Eritrea
National association football cups